In mathematics, every analytic function can be used for defining a matrix function that maps square matrices with complex entries to square matrices of the same size.

This is used for defining the exponential of a matrix, which is involved in the closed-form solution of systems of linear differential equations.

Extending scalar function to matrix functions 

There are several techniques for lifting a real function to a square matrix function such that interesting properties are maintained. All of the following techniques yield the same matrix function, but the domains on which the function is defined may differ.

Power series 
If the analytic function  has the Taylor expansion

then a matrix function  can be defined by substituting  by a square matrix: powers become matrix powers, additions become matrix sums and multiplications by coefficients become scalar multiplications.

Diagonalizable matrices
A square matrix  is diagonalizable, if there is an invertible matrix  such that  is a diagonal matrix, that is,  has the shape

As  it is natural to set

For example, suppose one is seeking  for

One has

for

Application of the formula then simply yields

Likewise,

Jordan decomposition 

All complex matrices, whether they are diagonalizable or not, have a Jordan normal form , where the matrix J consists of Jordan blocks. Consider these blocks separately and apply the power series to a Jordan block:

This definition can be used to extend the domain of the matrix function
beyond the set of matrices with spectral radius smaller than the radius of convergence of the power series.
Note that there is also a connection to divided differences.

A related notion is the Jordan–Chevalley decomposition which expresses a matrix as a sum of a diagonalizable and a nilpotent part.

Hermitian matrices 
A Hermitian matrix has all real eigenvalues and can always be diagonalized by a unitary matrix P, according to the spectral theorem.
In this case, the Jordan definition is natural. Moreover, this definition allows one to extend standard inequalities for
real functions:

(As a convention,  is a positive-semidefinite matrix.)
The proof follows directly from the definition.

Cauchy integral 
Cauchy's integral formula from complex analysis can also be used to generalize scalar functions to matrix functions. Cauchy's integral formula states that for any analytic function  defined on a set , one has

where  is a closed simple curve inside the domain  enclosing .

Then,  is definable by

This integral can readily be evaluated numerically using the trapezium rule, which converges exponentially in this case. That means that the precision of the result doubles when the number of nodes is doubled. In routine cases, this is bypassed by Sylvester's formula.

This idea applied to bounded linear operators on a Banach space, which can be seen as infinite matrices, leads to the holomorphic functional calculus.

Matrix perturbations 

The above Taylor power series allows the scalar  to be replaced by the matrix. This is not true in general when expanding in terms of  about  unless . We compute this in two ways,

 Distributive law: 

The scalar expression assumes commutativity while the matrix expression does not, and thus they cannot be equated directly unless . For some f(x) this can be dealt with using the same method as scalar Taylor series. For example, . If  exists then . The expansion of the first term then follows the power series given above,

The convergence criteria of the power series then apply, requiring  to be sufficiently small under the appropriate matrix norm. For more general problems, which cannot be rewritten in such a way that the two matrices commute, the ordering of matrix products produced by repeated application of the Leibniz rule must be tracked.

Arbitrary function of a 2×2 matrix 
An arbitrary function f(A) of a 2×2 matrix A has its Sylvester's formula simplify to

where  are the eigenvalues of its characteristic equation, and are given by

Examples 

 Matrix polynomial
 Matrix root
 Matrix logarithm
 Matrix exponential
 Matrix sign function

Classes of matrix functions 
Using the semidefinite ordering ( is positive-semidefinite and
 is positive definite), some
of the classes of scalar functions can be extended to matrix functions of Hermitian matrices.

Operator monotone 

This is analogous to monotone function in the scalar case.

Operator concave/convex 
A function  is called operator concave if and only if

This definition is analogous to a concave scalar function.

Examples
The matrix log is both operator monotone and operator concave. The matrix square is operator convex. The matrix exponential is none of these. Loewner's theorem states that a function on an open interval is operator monotone if and only if it has an analytic extension to the upper and lower complex half planes so that the upper half plane is mapped to itself.

See also
Algebraic Riccati equation
Sylvester's formula
Loewner order
Matrix calculus
Trace inequalities
Trigonometric functions of matrices

Notes

References
 

Matrix theory
Mathematical physics